Achillea abrotanoides is a herbaceous perennial flowering plant in the sunflower family. It is native to southeastern Europe (Greece, Albania, Croatia, Macedonia, etc.)

Description
The stem is subglabrous to tomentose. This plant blooms from June to August, with many-stellate white flowers.

Habitat
This plant prefers mountain regions with stony or rocky areas and debris.

References

abrotanoides
Flora of Southeastern Europe
Plants described in 1847